The Avión Torpedo was a liquid-propelled rocket-powered aircraft project designed by Pedro Paulet in 1902. Paulet would spend decades attempting to achieve funding for the project throughout Europe and Latin America, but found no donors.

Design and development 
Peruvian polymath Pedro Paulet developed a liquid-propellant rocket engine in 1895. In 1902, he designed the Avión Torpedo, a liquid-propellant rocket-powered aircraft that featured a canopy fixed to a delta tiltwing. Paulet's concept of using liquid-propellant was decades ahead of rocket engineers at the time who utilized black powder as a propellant.

In popular culture 

 The Avión Torpedo was featured in a Google Doodle to commemorate the birthday of Pedro Paulet in 2011

References

Bibliography 

Rocket-powered aircraft